Anna van der Kamp (born June 19, 1972 in Abbotsford, British Columbia) is a former rower from Canada, who won the silver medal in the Women's Eights at the 1996 Summer Olympics in Atlanta, Georgia. She formerly worked at the Delphi Group, but currently works for The Privy Council Office (Canada), and is a member of Clean Air Champions.

External links
Canadian Olympic Committee
Olympic Gold for Canadian Rowers
The Delphi Group

1972 births
Living people
Olympic silver medalists for Canada
Olympic rowers of Canada
Sportspeople from Abbotsford, British Columbia
Sportspeople from British Columbia
Rowers at the 1996 Summer Olympics
Canadian female rowers
Canadian people of Dutch descent
Olympic medalists in rowing
Medalists at the 1996 Summer Olympics